SMA Negeri 68 Jakarta (popularly abbreviated as enamlapan) is a public high school located at Salemba Raya street in Central Jakarta, Indonesia. The school is in one complex with SMP Negeri 216 Jakarta, SD Negeri Kenari, and Menza functional building. It was established on August 29, 1981 after being inaugurated by President Soeharto. In 2006, it was appointed to become RSBI (Rintisan Sekolah Bertaraf Internasional). Today, there are 840 students and 103 teachers and staff.

Facilities 
 Mosque
 Library
 Classrooms
 Language Laboratory
 Biology Laboratory
 Physics Laboratory
 Chemical Laboratory
 Social Studies Laboratory
 Computer Laboratory
 Audio Visual Room
 Functional Hall
 Principal's Room
 Teacher's room and lounge
 School Healthcare Unit's Room
 Cafeteria
 Courtyard
 Parking Lots
 Student's Organization Room

Extracurriculars and clubs
 ROHIS (Rohani Islam)
 SRP (Seksi Rohani Protestan)
 SRK (Seksi Rohani Katolik)
 PMR (Palang Merah Remaja)
 Paskibra
 MBrass 68 (Marching Band, Cheers, and Baron(Photography))
 KIR (Kelompok Ilmiah Remaja)
 Elpala (Enam Lapan Pencinta Alam)
 Futsal
 Basket
 Execom
 Tracesight (Traditional Dance Sixty Eight)
 TOSLA
 Pramuka
 Jacussie (Japanese Club of Sixty Eight)
 Silat
 Solitaire (English Club)
 Roxxels (Modern Dance of Sixty Eight)

Annual events 
SMA 68 has an annual event, usually held in October and early November, called Bazkom (Bazaar dan Kompetisi). Starting in 2016, 68 has another annual event, called FINAL(Festival Islam Enam Lapan).

See also 
 List of schools in Indonesia

Schools in Indonesia
Schools in Jakarta